Anselme Louis Bernard Bréchillet-Jourdain (28 November 1731, Paris – 16 January 1816, Paris, aged 84), was a French dentist and surgeon. The orientalist Amable Jourdain was his son.

Biography 
Jourdain was one of the most distinguished Frenchmen in the study and practice of dentistry. He long cooperated in the writing of the medical journal was not a stranger to the Histoire de l'anatomie by Portal.

Jourdain, who had not limited himself exclusively to the study of dentistry, carefully cultivated all parts of medicine, and was not devoid of erudition.

Publications 
 Nouveaux élémens d'odontalgie, Paris, 1756, in-12.
 Traité des dépôts dans le sinus maxillaire, des fractures et des caries de l'une et de l'autre mâchoire ; suivi de réflexions et d'observations sur toutes les opérations de l'art du dentiste, Paris, 1760, in-12.
 Essai sur la formation des dents, comparée avec celle des os ; suivi de plusieurs expériences, tant sur les os que sur les parties qui entrent dans leur constitution, Paris, 1766, in-12.
 Le Médecin des dames, ou l'art de les conserver en santé, with Goulin, Paris, 1771, in-12.
 Le Médecin des hommes, depuis la puberté jusqu'à l'extrême vieillesse, with Goulin, Paris, 1772, in-8°.
 Préceptes de santé, ou introduction au dictionnaire de santé, contestant les moyens de corriger les vices de son tempérament, et de le fortifier par le seul secours du régime et de l'exercice, ou l'art de conserver sa santé et de prévenir les maladies, Paris, 1772, in-8°. (this work was anonymous)
 Traité des maladies et des opérations réellement chirurgicales de la bouche et des parties qui y correspondent ; suivi de notes, d'observations intéressantes, tant anciennes que modernes, Paris, 1778, 2 vol. in-8°.(this work was anonymous)

Sources 
 Jean-Eugène Dezeimeris, Dictionnaire historique de la médecine ancienne et moderne, ou Précis de l'histoire générale, technologique et littéraire de la médecine, Bruxelles, Béchet jeune, 1836, .

External links 
 Biographie on Bibliothèque numérique Medic@
 First textbook on oral surgery on Roger Gaskell Rare Books
 Anselme Jourdain and his son on Dictionnaire des orientalistes de langue française
 Traité des maladies et des opérations réellement chirurgicales
 Le Médecin des dames by Jean Goulin with the help of Anselme Jourdain

18th-century French journalists
18th-century French physicians
French surgeons
French dentists
1731 births
Scientists from Paris
1816 deaths